Sri Ujjaini Mahakali Temple is a temple in the Secunderabad area in Telangana,India, is 191 years old. Devotees offer prayers to the goddess every day. In particular, Lakhs of devotees offer prayers during Ashada Jathara, which usually falls on Sunday and Monday. It is also popular during the festival of Bonalu.

History
It is believed that in the year 1813, Cholera broke out in the city and thousands of people died due to it. At the same time batch of military battalion transferred to Ujjain in Madhya Pradesh from Secunderabad. A doli bearer Suriti Appaiah along with his associates went to the Mahakali Devastanam at Ujjain and prayed for the benefit of people, if the people saved from the epidemic, he will install a deity of the goddess. AS soon as they have return from Ujjain, Appaiah and his associates installed the idol made of wood in Secunderabad in July 1814.

References

Hindu temples in Hyderabad, India
Shakti temples